Lafayette County, sometimes spelled La Fayette County, is a county located in the U.S. state of Wisconsin. It was part of the Wisconsin Territory at the time of its founding. As of the 2020 census, the population was 16,611. Its county seat is Darlington. The county was named in honor of the Marquis de Lafayette, the French general who rendered assistance to the Continental Army in the American Revolutionary War. The courthouse scenes from the 2009 film Public Enemies were filmed at the Lafayette County Courthouse in Darlington.

Geography

Major highways
  U.S. Highway 151
  Highway 11 (Wisconsin)
  Highway 23 (Wisconsin)
  Highway 78 (Wisconsin)
  Highway 81 (Wisconsin)
  Highway 126 (Wisconsin)

Buses
List of intercity bus stops in Wisconsin

Adjacent counties
 Grant County - west
 Iowa County - north
 Green County - east
 Stephenson County, Illinois - southeast
 Jo Daviess County, Illinois - south

Demographics

2020 census
As of the census of 2020, the population was 16,611. The racial makeup of the county was 91.7% White, 0.3% Native American, 0.2% Asian, 0.2% Black or African American, 3.7% from other races, and 3.9% from two or more races. Ethnically, the population was 6.6% Hispanic or Latino of any race.

2000 census

As of the 2000 census, there were 16,137 people, 6,211 households, and 4,378 families residing in the county. The population density was 26 people per square mile (10/km2). There were 6,674 housing units at an average density of 10 per square mile (4/km2). The racial makeup of the county was 99.03% White, 0.11% Black or African American, 0.11% Native American, 0.22% Asian, 0.04% Pacific Islander, 0.14% from other races, and 0.35% from two or more races. 0.57% of the population were Hispanic or Latino of any race. 33.8% were of German, 17.5% Norwegian, 13.6% Irish, 11.9% English, 6.8% Swiss and 6.0% American ancestry.

There were 6,211 households, out of which 33.30% had children under the age of 18 living with them, 59.00% were married couples living together, 7.60% had a female householder with no husband present, and 29.50% were non-families. 25.40% of all households were made up of individuals, and 13.10% had someone living alone who was 65 years of age or older. The average household size was 2.57 and the average family size was 3.10.

In the county, the population was spread out, with 27.20% under the age of 18, 7.60% from 18 to 24, 27.20% from 25 to 44, 22.10% from 45 to 64, and 15.80% who were 65 years of age or older. The median age was 38 years. For every 100 females there were 99.80 males. For every 100 females age 18 and over, there were 98.00 males.

Communities

Cities
 Cuba City (mostly in Grant County)
 Darlington (county seat)
 Shullsburg

Villages

 Argyle
 Belmont
 Benton
 Blanchardville (partly in Iowa County)
 Gratiot
 Hazel Green (mostly in Grant County)
 South Wayne

Towns

 Argyle
 Belmont
 Benton
 Blanchard
 Darlington
 Elk Grove
 Fayette
 Gratiot
 Kendall
 Lamont
 Monticello
 New Diggings
 Seymour
 Shullsburg
 Wayne
 White Oak Springs
 Willow Springs
 Wiota

Census-designated places
 Wiota
 Woodford

Other unincorporated communities

 Avon
 Calamine
 Elk Grove
 Etna
 Fayette
 Five Corners
 Ipswich
 Jenkinsville
 Lamont
 Leadmine
 Leslie
 Meekers Grove
 New Diggings
 Red Rock
 Riverside
 Seymour Corners
 Slateford
 Strawbridge
 Truman
 White Oak
 Yellowstone

Politics

See also
 National Register of Historic Places listings in Lafayette County, Wisconsin

References

Further reading
 Commemorative Biographical Record of the Counties of Rock, Green, Grant, Iowa, and Lafayette, Wisconsin, Containing Biographical Sketches of Prominent and Representative Citizens, and of Many of the Early Settled Families. Chicago: J. H. Beers and Co., 1901.
 History of La Fayette County, Wisconsin. Chicago: Western Historical Company, 1881.

External links

 Lafayette County government website
 Lafayette County map from the Wisconsin Department of Transportation
 Lafayette Development Corporation 

 
1846 establishments in Wisconsin Territory
Populated places established in 1846